"Itsy Bitsy Spider" is a pop song recorded by the Dutch singer EliZe. It features rapper Jay Colin. The song was released as the fifth single from EliZe's 2006 debut album In Control.

Track listing

CD single
"Itsy Bitsy Spider" (featuring Jay Colin) – 3:13
"Itsy Bitsy Spider" [album version] – 3:12
"No Good to Me" – 3:35 1

1 "No Good to Me" was written by EliZe, Peter Hartmann, Jan Langhoff and Linda Holmberg.

Charts

References

EliZe songs
2006 singles
Songs written by RedOne
2006 songs